Sweet Earth Flower is a tribute album His Name is Alive recorded to honor the music of Marion Brown. Although it appeared after the Xmmer album, it was recorded between the release of Detrola and Xmmer. It was released by the High Two label in 2007.

Track listing

Side A
 Sweet Earth Flying - 6:58
 Juba Lee - 8:02
 Capricorn Moon (live) - 13:32
 November Cotton Flower - 4:34

Side B
 Bismillahi 'Rrahmani 'Rrahim - 4:47
 Geechee Recollections (I) - 9:07
 Geechee Recollections (II) - 6:11
 Sweet Earth Flying (live) - 7:22

Compositions
All pieces were composed by Marion Brown, except "Bismillahi 'Rrahmani 'Rrahim," which was  written by longtime Brown collaborator Harold Budd. The track appears on Budd's Pavilion of Dreams album, as well as the Brown album Vista.

Recording sessions
The album was recorded partly as a live concert and partly in studio sessions. The album's three live tracks were recorded November 2004 at University of Michigan Museum of Art.

Other musicians
While His Name is Alive has been a rotating cast of musicians since its inception, Sweet Earth Flower features a new crop of contributors. Elliot Bergman, leader of the Michigan band Nomo, was a key contributor to Detrola. He appears on much of Sweet Earth Flower, with much of Nomo in tow. Dan Piccolo, Michael Herbst, Justin Walter, Erik Hall, and Olman Piedra.

Personnel
 Warn Defever - guitar, piano
 Elliot Bergman - tenor saxophone, Rhodes
 Jamie Saltsman - double bass
 Justin Walter - trumpet
 Jamie Easter - percussion
 Dan Piccolo - drums, percussion
 Michael Herbst - alto saxophone
 Erik Hall - electric piano
 Olman Piedra - congas, cajon

Sleeve
The album's sleeve was designed by Warn Defever and Dion Fischer. It features two stencil images of Brown. The cover features a reverse image of Brown.

Release history

See also
Marion Brown
His Name is Alive
Nomo (band)
Warn Defever

Notes

External links
Album notes and reviews from High Two

His Name Is Alive albums
High Two albums
Tribute albums
2007 compilation albums